The Wayne State Warriors football team is the college football team at Wayne State University in Detroit, Michigan. The Wayne State football team played their first game in October 1918. The Wayne State Warriors have competed in the Great Lakes Intercollegiate Athletic Conference since 1999 (and previously from 1975 to 1989), and are currently a Division II member of the National Collegiate Athletic Association (NCAA). Wayne State plays their home games at Tom Adams Field at Wayne State Stadium. All Wayne State games are broadcast on WDTK radio.

Home venue

The WSU football team had multiple venues during its early years, including Goldberg Field, University of Detroit Stadium and Keyworth Stadium. The first long-term location for the football team was Tartar Field, followed by Tom Adams Field in Wayne State Stadium.

Coaches/Athletic director

Rob Fournier became the athletic director for Wayne State in September 2000. He is also currently a finance committee member for the conference. Before coming to WSU, he was a part of the commissioner's staff for the Mid-American Conference. He received his Bachelor of Science, master's and law degree from University of Akron.

The former head football coach for the Wayne State Warriors is Paul Winters. He was the head coach from 2004 until 2022, when he was let go. He started his collegiate football career as the running back for the University of Akron. Upon graduation he then went on to become the assistant and then onto the backfield coach. After his time at Akron, he spent the next eight years coaching at the University of Toledo and then the University of Wisconsin. He then returned to Akron as the Running Backs Coach and Offensive Coordinator before coming to Wayne State. Winters is a three-time GLIAC Coach of the Year (2006, 2008 and 2019).

The assistant coaches include Scott Wooster (head of Offensive line), Chris Calley (Wide Receivers Coach). Lou West (defensive backs), Jay Peterson (linebackers), Jeff Reardon (Quarterbacks and Passing Game Coordinator), and Scott Kazmierski (defensive line coach).

Mascot

The team changed its name from the Tartars to the Warriors in 1999. The mascot for the Warriors, “W”, debuted in 2005.

All-Americans

The Warriors have had five All-American players in their history. In 2006, David Chudzinski was first team All-American for the offensive side of the ball. Joique Bell was another offensive player named 2009 first team All-American; he was also given the Harlon Hill Trophy in the same year. This award is given to the All-Around best player in Division II football. An all-purpose, first team All-American, Josh Renel, was named in 2010. Both Joe Long (offense) and Jeremy Jones (defense) were named 2011 first team All-Americans. Long was also awarded the Gene Upshaw Award in 2011. Leon Eggleston was First Team All American in 2019.

National Championship Runner Up

After barely making the Division II Playoffs in 2011, the Warriors made it all the way to the national championship game before losing to the Pittsburg State Gorillas of Kansas. It was the first year that the football program had ever made it to the playoffs in their entire history. The Warriors won all of their road games, traveling across the country and ending up in Florence, AL for the playoffs. A tragic shooting and murder of a WSU player, Cortez Smith, inspired the team for success.

Conference championships

Individual award winners

GLIAC Coach of the Year
Dick Lowry – 1975
Paul Winters – 2006, 2008, 2019

GLIAC Freshman of the Year
Joique Bell – 2006
Kevin Smith – 2008

Warriors in the NFL
Wayne State has had six players drafted in the NFL.

Notable Warrior coaches
 Norman "Happy" Wann – former head coach at Ball State 
 Brian VanGorder – Defensive coordinator at Bowling Green State University; former defensive coordinator at Georgia and Notre Dame; Broyles Award winner

Notable Warrior players
 Vic Zucco – former DB for the Chicago Bears 
 Richard Byas, Jr. – former DB for the Atlanta Falcons 
 John Sokolosky – former C for the Detroit Lions
 Paul Butcher, Sr. – former LB for Detroit, St. Louis, Indianapolis, Carolina and Oakland 
 Tom E. Beer – former FB and LB for the Detroit Lions 
 Joique Bell – former RB for the Detroit Lions
 Chris Fehn – custom percussionists, Slipknot

References

External links
 

 
American football teams established in 1918
1918 establishments in Michigan
American football teams in Detroit